Sotero Aranguren Labairu (7 May 1894 – 26 February 1922), was an Argentine footballer born in Buenos Aires who spend his youth in Basque Country. He was a midfielder and played most of his career for Real Madrid CF. He and his brother Eulogio were team-mates at Real Madrid.

Biography
He played for Real Madrid for seven years, between 1911 and 1918, scoring 4 goals in 60 matches.

He is considered "the first white symbol" by the Real Madrid official website.

His premature death at the age of 28 led the club to build a statue representing Sotero and one of his team-mates, Machimbarrena (who also died young) at the entrance of the first team's locker room. The statue, added in 1925, now stands at the Santiago Bernabéu Stadium, and is seen as a totem of inspiration for Real Madrid's coming generations of footballers.

Sotero and Eulogio Aranguren were the first Argentine footballers who played for Real Madrid.

Honours
Real Madrid
Copa del Rey: 1917
Campeonato Regional Centro: 1912–13, 1915–16, 1916–17

External links 
 Sotero's biography at Real Madrid official website (Spanish)

References

1894 births
1922 deaths
Argentine footballers
Real Madrid CF players
Association football midfielders
Spanish footballers
Footballers from Buenos Aires
Footballers from the Basque Country (autonomous community)
Argentine people of Basque descent